Carmen Get It! is a Tom and Jerry animated short film, released on December 21, 1962. It was the thirteenth and final short in the series to be directed by Gene Deitch and produced by William L. Snyder in Czechoslovakia. This short was Deitch's last with MGM, as Chuck Jones took over production of the Tom and Jerry cartoons shortly afterwards in Pent-House Mouse (1963).

Plot
Tom chases Jerry into the opera house, where Carmen is being performed, but every time he is quickly thrown off the premises by the guard. After an attempt to get in disguised as someone to see the show fails, Tom disguises himself as a musician carrying a double bass case, successfully bluffing his way through by holding the case in front of his body. Spotting a nearby mouse hole, he opens the double bass case, inside which is a cello case, inside which is a viola case, inside which is a violin case, inside which is a fake 24 or 25-inch long violin containing a tape player with a reel-to-reel tape of "Carmen". Rubbing his bow with cheese, Tom starts up the tape as the conductor begins the overture. With the tape covering for him, Tom waves his bow in front of the mouse hole. Fortunately, the scent of cheese draws Jerry out. Tom then smacks Jerry with his bow and catches him before rubbing him over the strings of his violin, but Jerry climbs into the violin's body and speeds up the tape. The noise provokes the conductor's ire, and he angrily marches up to Tom and smacks him over the head with the violin.

Jerry then climbs up the conductor's tuxedo and causes him to start frantically gyrating and to misconduct the orchestra into playing a jazzy rendition of the overture. He flings Jerry from his tuxedo into an orchestra member's tuba, where Tom catches him with a baseball glove. Jerry escapes again, and runs to the podium, where the conductor is getting a drink of water and catching his breath. Tom climbs onto the podium to catch Jerry, but the conductor slams the book onto Tom, leaving the marks of musical notes on his stomach. The conductor resumes the overture and throws Tom off the podium onto the floor.

Meanwhile, Jerry makes his way into a break room and spots a colony of ants. Getting an idea, he leads them a la the Pied Piper to the podium where the conductor has left. He then has the ants settle onto blank pages of the score, looking like musical notes. He then gets Tom's attention, and as Tom tried to get him at the conductor's stand, the spotlight goes back on. Tom has no choice but to conduct the orchestra. However, when he reaches the page with the ants and mistakes them for notes, Jerry starts having them change positions, causing Tom to misconduct the music, to the point where it changes to an assortment of traditional American songs including "Yankee Doodle", "I Wish I Was In Dixie" and "There'll Be A Hot Time In The Old Town Tonight". Finally, the ants scatter, causing Tom to realize he's been tricked, followed by spotting Jerry. He then grabs the mouse and jabs into the podium's light socket and turns it on, lighting Jerry up. Just then, the conductor returns and Tom runs off.

The opera finally begins, and the singer playing Carmen walks onto the stage. She is just about to begin singing, when she suddenly gets petrified and screams at the sight of a strutting mouse (Jerry dressed as a toreador dancing at the front of the stage), and she quickly runs away backstage. Tom takes the stage and catches Jerry, but the red-faced conductor sees him and falsely believes that he intentionally ruined the opera by placing Jerry on the stage in the first place. He loses his temper and his mind, and he goes on the stage to blocks Tom's way, indicating that he has had enough of Tom's shenanigans and wants to pursue corporal disciplinary action. Jerry gives a terrified Tom a red blanket, and the conductor goes wild like a furious bull. The dignified opera thus devolves into a farcical bullfight between Tom and the conductor while Jerry took over the conducting duties. After the music finishes, Jerry bows down to the audience, and the ants form "THE END".

References

External links

1962 films
1962 short films
Films about opera
Films directed by Gene Deitch
Animated films set in New York City
Tom and Jerry short films
Bullfighting films
1960s American animated films
American musical comedy films
Animated films without speech
1962 animated films
1962 musical comedy films
Metro-Goldwyn-Mayer short films
Metro-Goldwyn-Mayer animated short films
Films based on Carmen
Rembrandt Films short films